A cat collar is a piece of material put around the neck of a cat. Cat collars are used for identification, fashion, protection (as from fleas), restraint, or to warn off prey, and may be worn by cats that are indoor-only as well as cats with outdoor access.

Collar safety 
As of 2021, there is ongoing debate about whether standard or breakaway collars (collars that unclasp with the application) are safer, or if cat collars are safe at all. 

A 2010 study reported on in the New York Times showed that simple buckle collars are actually the safest for cats. Another study from 2013 showed that the dangers to a cat that is lost outside without a collar (or having lost its collar) were substantially greater than the danger of a cat hurting itself on its collar. 

However, vets and animal welfare organizations continue to primarily recommend breakaway collars, as they present the least risk of a cat injuring itself on a collar.

Types of collars 

Typical cat collars may be secured on the neck of the cat via a simple buckle, an elastic strap, or a breakaway buckle. Harnesses may also be used. Elizabeth collars are cones which prevent cats from licking themselves, often used to help cats recover from injury.

Anti-predation collars 
Domesticated cats are among the most significant predators of wild birds—being responsible for over a billion bird deaths every year, as well as the extinction of 22 species of bird as of 2015. Anti-predation collars may be used to reduce bird deaths from domesticated cats. These collars may include conspicuous fabrics, colors, and/or bells. A 2013 study reported on in The Atlantic showed that cats wearing anti-predation collars killed 19 times fewer birds than cats without anti-predation collars.

See also 

 Dog collar
 Collar (animal)

References 

Cat equipment